Hou is a Chinese surname, listed the 80th in the Hundred Family Surnames. It is romanized Hau in Cantonese. It originated from a Chinese nobility title, often translated as "marquis."

Notable people
 Alyson Hau (Hou Jiaming), Hong Kong DJ/presenter
 Hau Yung Sang, Chinese/Republic of China international footballer
 Hou Baolin, Xiangsheng performer
 Hou Bin, athlete
 Hou Ching-shan, Deputy Minister of Foreign Affairs of the Republic of China
 Hou Chong-wen, Deputy Mayor of Chiayi City
 Hou Dejian, songwriter from Taiwan
 Hou Hsiao-hsien, film director
 Hou Junji, Tang Dynasty general
 Hou Minghao, actor
 Hou Sheng-mao, Minister of Department of Health of the Republic of China (2005-2008)
 Hou Yao, pioneering film director, screenwriter, and theorist
 Hou Yaowen, actor
 Hou Yifan, chess player
 Hou You-yi, Deputy Mayor of New Taipei City (2016-2018)
 John Hou Sæter, Norwegian football player
 Yi-Jia Susanne Hou, violinist
 Yojun Hou, Entrepreneur
 Hou Zhihui, Chinese weightlifter

Fictional characters
Ranka Hou, character from Mr. Driller

See also
 Five Great Clans of the New Territories

Chinese-language surnames
Individual Chinese surnames